Dacrydium pectinatum is a species of conifer in the family Podocarpaceae. It grows naturally in Hainan, Borneo, the Philippines and Sumatra.

References

pectinatum
Flora of Hainan
Trees of Borneo
Trees of the Philippines
Trees of Sumatra
Plants described in 1969
Taxonomy articles created by Polbot
Taxa named by David John de Laubenfels